The 2009 African Nations Championship Final was a football match held on 8 March 2009, and was the culmination of the inaugural tournament organised by CAF, aimed at players playing in their domestic leagues. The final was contested by DR Congo and Ghana, who had met earlier in the group stage, where Ghana ran out 3–0 winners. However, this was not to be the case, as DR Congo comfortably won 2–0 to record their first triumph in a continental competition since the 1974 African Nations Cup, where, as Zaire, they defeated Zambia 2–0 in the replay

Match details

Lineups

References

2009
Final
Ghana national football team matches
Democratic Republic of the Congo national football team matches
March 2009 sports events in Africa